The Reference Islands is a group of rocky islands 2 nautical miles (3.7 km) west-northwest of the west tip of Neny Island and 1.5 nautical miles (2.8 km) southeast of Millerand Island, lying in Marguerite Bay off the west coast of Graham Land. First roughly charted in 1936 by the British Graham Land Expedition (BGLE) under Rymill. The islands were surveyed by the Falkland Islands Dependencies Survey (FIDS) in 1947, and so named by them because they served as a convenient reference point for survey work.

See also 
 List of Antarctic and sub-Antarctic islands
 

Islands of Graham Land
Fallières Coast